MikroElektronika (stylized as MikroE) is a Serbian manufacturer and retailer of hardware and software tools for developing embedded systems. The company headquarters is in Belgrade, Serbia.

Its best known software products are mikroC, mikroBasic and mikroPascal compilers for programming microcontrollers. Its flagship hardware product line is Click boards, a range of more than 550 add-on boards for interfacing microcontrollers with peripheral sensors or transceivers. These boards conform to mikroBUS – a standard conceived by MikroElektronika and later endorsed by NXP Semiconductors and Microchip Technology, among others. MikroElektronika is also known for Hexiwear, an Internet of things development kit developed in partnership with NXP Semiconductors.

History
Serbian entrepreneur — and current company owner and CEO — Nebojša Matić started publishing an electronics magazine called "MikroElektronika" in 1997. In 2001, the magazine was shut down and MikroElektronika repositioned itself as a company focused on producing development boards for microcontrollers and publishing books for developing embedded systems.

The company started offering compilers in 2004, with the release of mikroPascal for PIC and mikroBasic for PIC — compilers for programming 8-bit microcontrollers from Microchip Technology. Between 2004 and 2015 the company released C, Basic and Pascal compilers for seven microcontroller architectures: PIC, PIC32, dsPIC/PIC24, FT90x, AVR, 8051, and ARM® (supporting STMicroelectronics, Texas Instruments and Microchip-based ARM® Cortex microcontrollers).

In conjunction with compilers, MikroElektronika kept its focus on producing development boards while gradually ceasing its publishing activities. Its current generation of the "Easy" boards brand was released in 2012. One of the flagship models, EasyPIC Fusion v7 was nominated for best tool at the Embedded World 2013 exhibition in Nurembeg, an important embedded systems industry gathering. Other product lines were introduced as well, including the "mikroProg" line of hardware programmers and debuggers, and the range of sensor and transceiver add-on boards known as click boards.

During this time span the company developed relationships with various semiconductor vendors and distributors. It became an official partner of Microchip Technology, NXP Semiconductors, Texas Instruments, STMicroelectronics, Imagination Technologies, Telit, Quectel, and U-blox. MikroElektronika also built up its worldwide distributor network by partnering with Digi-Key, Mouser Electronics, Future Electronics, RS Components as well as more than 50 local distributors in all continents.

Responding to rising public interest in the Internet of things, in 2016 MikroElektronika released Hexiwear, a wearable development kit created in partnership with NXP Semiconductors. Hexiwear was funded through Kickstarter. Since its release on the market, it won four industry awards: Best in Show, Reader's Choice, and Best IoT product at ARM TechCon 2016 Innovation Challenge, 2016 ECN Impact award, as well as Best for Rapid Prototyping at the Hackster Maker Madness competition.

Product lines

MikroElektronika's catalog comprises more than 700 products. The following table lists its main product lines.

References

External links
 

Companies based in Belgrade
Technology companies established in 1997
Computer companies of Serbia
D.o.o. companies in Serbia
Electronics companies of Serbia
Microcontroller companies
Serbian brands
Software companies of Serbia
Serbian companies established in 1997
Electronics companies established in 1997